A list of books and essays about Lars von Trier:

Trier
Bibliography